Tie Ying (1916 – February 6, 2009) was a Chinese politician and People's Liberation Army major general. He was born in Nanle County, Henan Province. He was Secretary of the Chinese Communist Party's Zhejiang Province Committee (1977) as well as Governor of Zhejiang (February 1977 – December 1979).

References
我的爸爸铁瑛. 杭州网. [2012-04-22].
三任秘书忆铁瑛. 网易. [2012-04-22].
铁瑛同志在浙江省委的十二年. 杭州日报. [2012-04-22].
向铁瑛同志遗体告别. 浙江日报. [2012-04-22].
铁瑛同志逝世. 人民网. [2012-04-22].

1916 births
2009 deaths
People's Republic of China politicians from Henan
Chinese Communist Party politicians from Henan
People's Liberation Army generals from Henan
Governors of Zhejiang
Political office-holders in Zhejiang